The St. Peter's Church is a religious building belonging to the Catholic Church which is next to a monastery in Tiberias, a town on the western shore of the Sea of Galilee, in the Lower Galilee, in northern District of Israel. The church is named after St. Peter one of the apostles of Jesus, because it is near where Catholics believe that St. Peter was a fisherman in Galilee.

The church was founded in the early twelfth century by the Crusaders. With the conquest of Tiberias by Muslims after the defeat of Christians in the Battle of Hattin in 1187 it became a mosque.

During the eighteenth century, the interest of the members of the Franciscan order in the church, began to visit her, first at the feast of St. Peter, and then permanently renewed. During this century the Franciscans retook control of the church. In 1833 he was brought a replica of the statue of St. Peter by Arnolfo di Cambio an exact replica of the one that exists in the Vatican, and in 1847 established a monastery near the church. In 1870 the current facade of the temple was built. After World War II was built a memorial wall depicting various issues related to the Catholic Church in Poland and the central image of the Black Madonna of Czestochowa.

See also
Roman Catholicism in Israel
Latin Patriarchate of Jerusalem

References

Roman Catholic churches in Israel
Buildings and structures in Tiberias